Hood County News is an American twice weekly newspaper, serving Granbury and Hood County, Texas. It is descended from the Granbury Vidette, established by W. L. Bond and Francis Edward Garland in November 1872, and the Granbury News, established by J. D. Ballard around 1884. In 1878, Ashley W. Crockett, a grandson of Davy Crockett, was associated with the Granbury Vidette, which he took over completely by August 1883. It also descends from other newspapers, through a series of mergers and other ownership changes, and name changes. Under the ownership of Hood County News, Incorporated, it began its current form in November 1970.

The paper won a number of awards at the 2010 convention of the Texas Press Association. It also prints the Texas Press Messenger for Texas Press Association.

References

Newspapers published in Texas